Lucien-Pierre Sergent (8 June 1849 – 1904) was a French academic painter.  He was known for his military art.

Early life
Sergent was born in 1849 at Massy in the Seine-et-Oise department.

He was known as a student of Vauchelet Pils and Jean-Paul Laurens.

Career
His 1874 painting, Le dernier effort à la porte Ballan, fin de la bataille de Sedan 1re septembre 1870 was purchased by the French government.  It was installed at Prytanée National Militaire in the city of La Flèche.

His 1888 painting The Battles of Vicksburg, was a 360° panorama of the land and naval battles of Vicksburg in 1863 during the American Civil War.   The work was completed and first exhibited in Paris; and it was subsequently shown in New York City, Chicago and San Francisco before it was installed in Tokyo.

Notes

References
 Chavignerie, Emile Bellier de la Chavignerie and Louis Auvray. (1882). Dictionnaire général des artistes de l'école française depuis l'origine des arts du dessin jusqu'à nos jours. Architectes, peintres, sculpteurs, graveurs et lithographes.  Paris: Renouard.  OCLC 4385528
 Karel, David. (1992). Dictionnaire des artistes de langue française en Amérique du Nord: peintres, sculpteurs, dessinateurs, graveurs, photographes et orfèvres. Québec: Musée du Québec.  ;  OCLC 27223982
 Montrosier, Eugène. (1881). Les peintres militaires : contenant les biographies de MM. de Neuville, Detaille, Berne-Bellecour, Dupray, Jazet, Couturier, Sergent, Chaperon, Protais, Médard et Walker. Paris: Librairie artistique, H. Launette.  OCLC 123093472

External links
  Drawings in the Louvre
 Battles of Vicksburg, cyclorama in Tokyo, circa 1891

1849 births
1904 deaths
19th-century French painters
French male painters
20th-century French painters
20th-century French male artists
19th-century French male artists